The Living Corpse is a 1929 German-Soviet silent drama film directed by Fyodor Otsep and starring  Vsevolod Pudovkin, Maria Jacobini and Viola Garden. It is based on the 1911 posthumously debuted play The Living Corpse by Leo Tolstoy. It was made as a co-production between the Russian-based Mezhrabpomfilm and the Communist-backed German company Prometheus Film.

Plot
At the center of the action is Fyodor Protassov whose marriage with his wife Liza is largely finished. As the Russian Orthodox Church does not tolerate divorce, he one day fakes his suicide so that his wife can be with her lover Viktor Karenin. While he begins to lead a life of illegality and subterfuge which despite his new companion does not make him content, this decisive step to the fake death which has made him a "living corpse" is no real happiness.

One day it is found out that Fyodor is still alive and that Liza is guilty of bigamy. She is accused and a sentence for her "offense" waits for her, which is in actuality Fyodor's. Protassov, who never wanted to take this so far, decides therefore to one last sacrifice: he now completes the deceived act and actually commits suicide by shooting himself.

Cast
 Vsevolod Pudovkin  as Fyodor Protasov 
 Maria Jacobini  as Yelizaveta Andreyevna Protasova (Liza)  
 Viola Garden  as Sasha (Liza's sister)  
 Julia Serda  as Anna Pavlovna  
 Nato Vachnadze  as Masha, a gypsy  
 Gustav Diessl  as Viktor Mikhajlovich Karenin  
 Vera Maretskaya  as Prostitute 
 Daniil Vvedenskiy  as Artem'ev (The Good Spirit)  
 Vladimir Uralsky as Petushkov 
 Boris Barnet as Sailor in tavern  
 Carola Höhn  
 Karl Junge-Swinburne 
 Porfiri Podobed 
 Pyotr Repnin  
 Sylvia Torf

References

Bibliography
 Taylor, Richard. Film Propaganda: Soviet Russia and Nazi Germany. I.B.Tauris, 1998.

External links

Films of the Weimar Republic
Soviet silent feature films
German silent feature films
Films directed by Fedor Ozep
Films based on works by Leo Tolstoy
Soviet black-and-white films
German black-and-white films
Soviet films based on plays
German films based on plays